Arion intermedius is a species of land slug in the family Arionidae, the roundback slugs. It is known commonly as the hedgehog slug, hedgehog arion, or glade slug.

Distribution 
It is native to Western Europe and a part of Central Europe. It is native to Czechia where majority of its records come from various types of forests. It is non-native to Slovakia since 2020. It is known as an introduced species in many other regions, including North America, Australia, New Zealand, North Africa, South Africa, and the Pacific Islands.

Description
This slug is 1.5 to 2 centimeters long. It is variable in color and patterning, being white, orange, or gray, with or without banding, and it has gray tentacles and a yellow or orange sole. It becomes compact and "nearly bell-shaped" when contracted. The tubercles that texture the dorsal surface of its body taper to sharp, prickle-like points, inspiring the common name hedgehog slug.

Biology
This species occurs in natural habitat such as grasslands and forests, and on cultivated or otherwise human-altered land, such as pastures, orchards, and hedges. It feeds on plants and fungi.

For a long time, this hermaphroditic slug was thought to reproduce only by self-fertilization; solitary captive specimens produced offspring and the species had never been observed mating. Genetic analysis provided evidence of crossing and the species is now believed to have a mixed breeding system, with an individual having the ability to fertilize itself or cross-fertilize, exchanging sperm with a mate.

In the wild it has one generation per year (univoltine), with all individuals maturing rather synchronously in autumn. Adults die over winter or early spring.

As a pest
This is not considered to be a severe pest, but some reports of such problems have been made. While most exotic slugs and snails are often found in altered environments, this species has a greater tendency to invade natural habitat, such as forests. Its ability to self-fertilize allows a single individual to enter new habitat and then reproduce. It is also known as a pest of clover-seeded pastures in New Zealand.

References

 Spencer, H.G., Marshall, B.A. & Willan, R.C. (2009). Checklist of New Zealand living Mollusca. Pp 196-219 in Gordon, D.P. (ed.) New Zealand inventory of biodiversity. Volume one. Kingdom Animalia: Radiata, Lophotrochozoa, Deuterostomia. Canterbury University Press, Christchurch.

External links
Arion intermedius at Animalbase taxonomy,short description, distribution, biology,status (threats), images 
 Arion intermedius images at Encyclopedia of Life 

Arion (gastropod)
Gastropods described in 1852
Molluscs of Europe